Culver is an extinct town in Bates County, in the U.S. state of Missouri.

Culver was founded in the 1890s, and named after A H. Culver, a local storekeeper. A post office called Culver was established in 1894, and remained in operation until 1901.

References

Ghost towns in Missouri
Former populated places in Bates County, Missouri